Sergei Rachmaninoff (1873–1943) was a Russian composer, pianist, and conductor.

Rachmaninoff or Rachmaninov may also refer to:

Rachmaninoff (crater), a crater on Mercury
Rachmaninoff (vodka), a German vodka
Ivan Rakhmaninov (1753–1807), Russian publisher, translator and educator
Yuri Pavlovich Rachmaninov (1936–2007), Soviet and Russian scientist, great-nephew of Sergei Rachmaninoff

See also
 

Russian-language surnames